Agrococcus lahaulensis is a bacterium from the genus Agrococcus which has been isolated from soil from the Lahaul-Spiti Valley.

References

Microbacteriaceae
Bacteria described in 2006